The Rec Comtal was an irrigation canal near Barcelona, Catalonia, which took water from the Besòs river to the walls of the city. Construction was begun by Miro, Count of Barcelona  in the 10th century, but it may date back to Roman times. It supplied water until the mid-20th century. In March 2016, extensive remains of structures associated with the system were discovered during excavations at Plaça de les Glòries Catalanes.

See also 

 Urban planning of Barcelona

References

Canals in Spain
History of Barcelona